Colin Peter McEvedy (6 June 1930 – 1 August 2005) was a British polymath scholar, psychiatrist, historian, demographer and non-fiction author.

Early life
Colin Peter McEvedy was born in Salford, Lancashire on 6 June 1930.  He was the third son of Peter George McEvedy, a renowned surgeon, who was born in New Zealand. Colin was educated at Harrow School, where he was a scholar, and Magdalen College, Oxford.

Career
McEvedy's profession was psychiatry, in which he had a distinguished career.  He became perhaps better known, though, as a historian and demographer, and certainly so by the public at large.   Between 1961 and 2002 he produced a number of historical atlases which, unlike most such atlases, feature fixed base-maps; in most cases, each atlas uses a single principal base-map, which is shown repeatedly, at many dates, as the atlas goes along, thus illustrating changes over the ages, from ancient down to modern, within the chosen area.  The accompanying text, typically, is mostly a running commentary on what the maps of a given atlas show.  Another feature of the atlases is McEvedy's witty and engaging writing-style, which he used on occasion to challenge established opinions among historians and demographers.  Although he was not, strictly speaking, a professional in those fields, he became professionally respected in them, with his views making their way into standard textbooks.

He died in London, following a diagnosis of terminal myelofibrosis.

Family life
McEvedy had three daughters, Binky, Flora, and Allegra and a son, Phillip. Flora McEvedy is the author of The Step-Parents' Parachute, published by Piatkus Books in 2009. His youngest daughter, Allegra McEvedy, is a noted chef, co-founded the Leon Restaurants chain, and was appointed Member of the Order of the British Empire (MBE) in the 2008 Birthday Honours.

Publications
Penguin Historical Atlases
The Penguin Atlas of Medieval History (1961) 
Revised as: The New Penguin Atlas of Medieval History (1992) 
The Penguin Atlas of Ancient History (1967) 
Revised as: The New Penguin Atlas of Ancient History (2002) 
The Penguin Atlas of Modern History (1972) 
The Penguin Atlas of Recent History (1982) 
Revised as: The New Penguin Atlas of Recent History (2002) 
The Penguin Atlas of North American History (1988) 
The Penguin Atlas of African History (1980, 2nd ed. 1995) 
The Penguin Historical Atlas of the Pacific (1998) 

The Atlas of World History (with Sarah McEvedy)
From the Beginning to Alexander the Great (1970) 
The Classical World (1973) 
The Dark Ages (1972) 
Unpublished Volumes:
The Medieval World
The European Expansion
Revolutions
Colonial Empires
The Modern Age

Other Books
The Atlas of World Population History (with Richard Jones) (1978) 
Rise of the World's Cities (1984) 
World History Factfinder (1984) 
Cities of the Classical World: An Atlas and Gazetteer of 120 Centres of Ancient Civilization, (posthumous; edited by Douglas Stuart Oles) (3 November 2011),  (hardcover), Allen Lane (imprint of Penguin Books, UK), Penguin Press/Classics (US).

Articles
"The Bubonic Plague" Scientific American February 1988

References

External links
 Obituary in The Independent
 Obituary in The Times
 Obituary in the British Medical Journal
 

English psychiatrists
British demographers
English cartographers
1930 births
2005 deaths
People educated at Harrow School
Alumni of Magdalen College, Oxford
20th-century English historians
20th-century cartographers